Erythrochiton giganteus is a species of plant in the family Rutaceae. It is endemic to Ecuador.

References

Sources

giganteus
Endemic flora of Ecuador
Endangered plants
Taxonomy articles created by Polbot